Tungala is a rural locality (a settlement) and the administrative center of Tungalinsky Selsoviet of Zeysky District, Amur Oblast, Russia. The population was 553 as of 2018. There are 3 streets.

Geography 
Tungala is located 238 km east of Zeya (the district's administrative centre) by road. Ogoron is the nearest rural locality.

References 

Rural localities in Zeysky District